Steen Bach Christensen (born 1 November 1941) is a Danish competitive sailor and Olympic medalist. He won a silver medal in the 5.5 Metre class at the 1960 Summer Olympics in Rome, together with William Berntsen and Søren Hancke.

References

External links
 
 
 
 

1941 births
Living people
Danish male sailors (sport)
Sailors at the 1960 Summer Olympics – 5.5 Metre
Olympic sailors of Denmark
Olympic silver medalists for Denmark
Olympic medalists in sailing
Medalists at the 1960 Summer Olympics